The 2002 FIBA World Championship was the 14th edition of the competition now known as the FIBA Basketball World Cup, the international world championship for men's basketball teams. The tournament held by the International Basketball Federation in Indianapolis, Indiana, United States, from August 29 to September 8, 2002.

Venues

Qualification 
There were 16 teams taking part in the 2002 World Cup of Basketball. Since the 2000 Olympics champions United States has direct access to the World Championship as host nation, the Olympic berth is left unused and one extra qualifying spot is assigned to FIBA Americas below.

 Host nation: 1 berth
 FIBA Asia: 14 teams competing for 2 berths
 FIBA Africa: 12 teams competing for 2 berths
 FIBA Americas: 10 teams competing for 5 berths
 FIBA Europe: 16 teams competing for 5 berths
 FIBA Oceania: 2 teams competing for 1 berth

Qualified teams

Squads

At the start of tournament, all 16 participating countries had 12 players on their roster.

Competing nations
The following nations' teams competed:

Preliminary round

The top three teams in each group advance to the second round, into either Group E or F. The fourth place team in each group moves onto the 13th–16th classification.

Group A

August 29, 2002

August 30, 2002

August 31, 2002

Group B

August 29, 2002

August 30, 2002

August 31, 2002

Group C

August 29, 2002

August 30, 2002

August 31, 2002

Group D
August 29, 2002

August 30, 2002

August 31, 2002

Second round
In this stage, the results in the preliminary rounds are combined and the teams who met previously do not play each other a second time. The teams that advanced from Group A and Group B are combined into Group E and teams that advanced from Group C and Group D are combined into Group F.

The top four from each group advance to the knockout stages; the bottom two advance to the Ninth-to-twelfth-place playoffs.

Group E

September 2, 2002

September 3, 2002

September 4, 2002

Group F

September 2, 2002

September 3, 2002

September 4, 2002

Classification round

13th–16th classification

Semifinals

Fifteenth place playoff

Thirteenth place playoff

9th–12th classification

Semifinals

Eleventh place playoff

Ninth place playoff

5th–8th classification

Semifinals

Seventh place playoff

Fifth place playoff

Final round

Quarterfinals

Semifinals

Third place playoff

Final

Awards

Final rankings

All tournament team

Top scorers (ppg)

  Dirk Nowitzki - 24.0
  Victor Díaz - 22.0
  Yao Ming - 21.0
  Marcelo Machado - 20.8
  Paul Pierce - 19.7
  Pau Gasol - 19.1
  Larry Ayuso - 18.7
  Peja Stojaković - 18.7
  Phill Jones - 18.2
  Fadi El Khatib - 17.6

References

External links
 
 

 
2002
2002 in basketball
2002–03 in American basketball
International basketball competitions hosted by the United States
Basketball in Indianapolis
2002 in sports in Indiana
August 2002 sports events in the United States
September 2002 sports events in the United States
2000s in Indianapolis
Sports competitions in Indianapolis